Narender Gahlot (born 24 April 2001) is an Indian footballer who plays as a defender for Indian Super League club Odisha and the India national team.

Club career

Indian Arrows
He made his professional debut playing for the Indian Arrows in 2018–19 I-League.

Odisha
In May 2022, Indian Super League club Odisha completed the signing of Gahlot, on a three-year deal. On 17 August, he made his debut for the club against NorthEast United in the Durand Cup, in a thumping 6–0 win.

International career
He made his international debut for India senior team on 7 July 2019 against Tajikistan during 2019 Intercontinental Cup, which India lost 2–4. He scored his first ever international goal in his second match against Syria on 16 July 2019 at the EKA arena in Ahmedabad. With this goal he became the first Indian player to score for the national team who was born in the 21st century and also became the then second youngest goal scorer for the national team at the age of 18 years 83 days behind Jerry Zirsanga. He also won his first Player of the match award in this match, as the game finished 1–1.

Career statistics

Club

International

International goals
Scores and results list India's goal tally first

Honours

India U-20
SAFF U-18 Championship: 2019

Jamshedpur
Indian Super League Premiers: 2021–22

References

2001 births
Living people
Indian footballers
Footballers from Delhi
Association football defenders
Indian Arrows players
Jamshedpur FC players
I-League players
India international footballers
India youth international footballers
Indian Super League players